This article lists by year the cases heard before the Judicial Committee of the House of Lords until it was replaced by the Supreme Court of the United Kingdom in October 2009. The House of Lords was the only body capable of hearing appeals from some courts of the United Kingdom; for instance, in England and Wales, it heard appeals from the Court of Appeal, and could in some circumstances hear appeals directly from the High Court of Justice.

1920 
 DPP v Beard [1920] AC 479, 14 Cr App Rep 159

1952 
 Carslogie Steamship Co v Royal Norwegian Government

1963 
 Attorney-General for Northern Ireland v Gallagher [1963] AC 349, 45 Cr App Rep 316

1982 
 Metropolitan Police Commissioner v Caldwell [1982] AC 341

1985 
 Anderton v Ryan

1986 
 British Leyland Motor Corp. v Armstrong Patents Co.
 R v Shivpuri [1986] UKHL 2

1988 

 Hotson v East Berkshire Health Authority [1988] UKHL 1

1989 
 R v Howe [1987] AC 417, 85 Cr App Rep 32

1991 
 R v R [1991] UKHL 12

1992 
 R v Gotts [1992] 2 AC 412, 94 Cr App Rep 312

1995 
 Brooks v Brooks [1995] 3 WLR 141
 Graysim Holdings Ltd v P&O Property Holdings Ltd [1995] 3 WLR 854
 R v Kingston [1995] 2 AC 355, [1994] 3 All ER 353

1996 

 Abnett v British Airways plc [1996] UKHL 5
 R v Associated Octel Co Ltd [1996] UKHL 1
 AXA Reinsurance (UK) plc v Field [1996] 1 WLR 1026
 Bate v Chief Adjudication Officer [1996] 1 WLR 814
 R (ex parte Williams) v Bedwellty Justices [1996] 3 WLR 361
 Biogen Inc v Medeva plc [1996] UKHL 18
 Brixey v Lynas [1996] UKHL 17
 R v Brown (Gregory Michael) [1996] 2 WLR 503
 Burrows v Brent LBC [1996] UKHL 20
 In re C (a minor) (Interim Care Order: Residential Assessment) [1996] UKHL 4
 R (ex parte Guney) v Central Criminal Court [1996] UKHL 11
 Charter Reinsurance Co Ltd v Fagan [1996] 2 WLR 726
 Chequepoint Sarl v McClelland [1996] 1 WLR 1431
 Chief Adjudication Officer v Quinn [1996] 1 WLR 1184
 R v Christou (George) [1996] 2 WLR 620
 Deeny v Gooda Walker Ltd [1996] 1 WLR 426
 Fine Art Developments plc v Customs and Excise Commissioners [1996] 1 WLR 1054
 In re H (minors) (Sexual Abuse: Standard of Proof) 1996 2 WLR 8
 Hill v Mercantile & General Reinsurance Co plc [1996] 1 WLR 1239
 Hindcastle Ltd v Barbara Attenborough Associates Ltd [1996] UKHL 19
 ICI plc v Colmer (Inspector of Taxes) (Reference to ECJ) [1996] 1 WLR 469
 In re L (a minor) (Police Investigation: Privilege) [1996] 2 WLR 395
 R v Khan (Sultan) [1996] UKHL 14
 R v Latif (Khalid) [1996] UKHL 16
 Lightbody or Jacques v Jacques [1996] UKHL 2
 R (ex parte Muldoon) v Liverpool City Council [1996] 1 WLR 1103
 Mercury Communications Ltd v Director General of Telecommunications [1996] 1 WLR 48
 Nuclear Electric plc v Bradley (Inspector of Taxes) [1996] 1 WLR 529
 O'Hara v Chief Constable of the Royal Ulster Constabulary [1996] UKHL 6
 R v Preddy (John Crawford) [1996] UKHL 13
 Robert Gordon's College v Customs and Excise Commissioners [1996] 1 WLR 201
 Ross & Cromarty District Council v Patience [1996] UKHL 7
 R (ex parte Abdi) v Secretary of State for the Home Department [1996] UKHL 9
 Shevill v Presse Alliance SA [1996] 3 WLR 420
 Slater v Finning Ltd [1996] UKHL 59
 Smith New Court Securities Ltd v Citibank NA [1996] UKHL 3
 South Australia Asset Management Corp v York Montague Ltd [1996] UKHL 10
 Steane v Chief Adjudication Officer [1996] 1 WLR 1195
 Stovin v Wise [1996] UKHL 15
 T v Secretary of State for the Home Department [1996] UKHL 8
 Vitol SA v Norelf Ltd (The Santa Clara) 3 WLR 105
 R (ex parte Beckwith) v Wandsworth LBC [1996] 1 WLR 60
 Westdeutsche Landesbank Girozentrale v Islington LBC [1996] UKHL 12

1997 

 R v Acott [1997] UKHL 5
 Attorney General's Reference No 3 of 1994 [1997] UKHL 31
 Bolitho v City and Hackney Health Authority [1997] UKHL 46
 R v Brown [1997] UKHL 33
 R v Burstow R v Ireland [1997] UKHL 34
 Chief Adjudication Officer v Wolke [1997] UKHL 50
 R v Chief Constable of the Royal Ulster Constabulary, ex parte Begley [1997] UKHL 39
 Circuit Systems Ltd and another v Zuken-Redac (UK) Ltd (formerly Racal-Redac (UK) Ltd) [1997] UKHL 51
 City of Edinburgh Council v Secretary of State for Scotland and others [1997] UKHL 38
 Clydesdale Bank plc v Davidson and others (Scotland) [1997] UKHL 55
 Cockburn v Chief Adjudication Officer and another and Secretary of State for Social Services v Fairey [1997] UKHL 18
 Commissioners of Inland Revenue v McGuckian [1997] UKHL 22
 Commissioners of Inland Revenue v Willoughby [1997] UKHL 29
 Connelly v RTZ Corporation plc and others [1997] UKHL 30
 Co-operative Insurance Society Ltd v Argyll Stores [1997] UKHL 17
 Director of Public Prosecutions v McKeown and Jones [1997] UKHL 4
 Elitestone Ltd v Morris and another [1997] UKHL 15
 R v Emmett and another [1997] UKHL 48
 Fellowes or Herd v Clyde Helicopters Ltd [1997] UKHL 6
 In re G (a minor) [1997] UKHL 16
 Girvan v Inverness Farmers Dairy and another [1997] UKHL 47
 Grovit and others v Doctor and others [1997] UKHL 13
 Hunter and others v Canary Wharf Ltd; Hunter and others v London Docklands Corporation [1997] UKHL 14
 Investors Compensation Scheme Ltd v West Bromwich Building Society [1997] UKHL 28
 Kleinwort Benson Ltd v City of Glasgow District Council [1997] UKHL 43
 In re Levin [1997] UKHL 27
 London Borough of Harrow v Johnstone [1997] UKHL 9
 Longden v British Coal Corporation [1997] UKHL 52
 Malik and Mahmud v Bank of Credit and Commerce International SA [1997] UKHL 23
 Mannai Investment Co Ltd v Eagle Star Assurance [1997] UKHL 19
 R v Martin [1997] UKHL 56
 MD Foods v Baines and others [1997] UKHL 7
 R v Mills and Poole [1997] UKHL 35
 Morris and others v Rayners Enterprises Incorporated and another [1997] UKHL 44
 Mulvey v Secretary of State for Social Security [1997] UKHL 10
 R v Myers [1997] UKHL 36
 Nykredit Mortgage Bank plc v Edward Erdman Group Ltd [1997] UKHL 53
 O'Rourke v Mayor Etc of the London Borough of Camden [1997] UKHL 24
 R v Powell and another [1997] UKHL 45
 Republic of India and others v India Steamship Company Ltd [1997] UKHL 40
 In re S (a minor) [1997] UKHL 32
 Sanderson v McManus [1997] UKHL 1
 Sarrio SA v Kuwait Investment Authority [1997] UKHL 49
 R v Secretary of State for Employment, ex parte Seymour Smith [1997] UKHL 11
 R v Secretary of State for the Home Department, ex parte Venables and Thompson [1997] UKHL 25
 R v Secretary of State for the Home Department, ex parte Launder [1997] UKHL 20
 R v Secretary of State for the Home Department, ex parte Pierson [1997] UKHL 37
 Semco Salvage & Marine Pte Ltd v Lancer Navigation [1997] UKHL 2
 Sharp and others v Woolwich Building Society [1997] UKHL 8
 Shimizu (UK) Ltd v Westminster City Council [1997] UKHL 3
 Smith v Governor and Company of the Bank of Scotland [1997] UKHL 26
 Soden and another v British & Commonwealth Holdings plc and others [1997] UKHL 41
 Strathclyde Regional Council v Zafar [1997] UKHL 54
 Tracy and others v Crosville Wales Ltd [1997] UKHL 42
 R v Wicks [1997] UKHL 21

1998 

 Airbus Industrie GIE v Patel and others [1998] UKHL 12
 Axis West Developments Ltd v Chartwell Land Investments Ltd (Scotland) [1998] UKHL 48
 Baker v Black Sea & Baltic General Insurance Company Ltd [1998] UKHL 18
 Baltic Insurance Group v Jordan Grand Prix Ltd and others and Quay Financial Software Ltd and others [1998] UKHL 49
 Banque Financière De La Cité v Parc (Battersea) Ltd and others [1998] UKHL 7
 R v Bartle and the Commissioner of Police for the Metropolis and others, ex parte Pinochet [1998] UKHL 41
 Beaufort Developments (NI) Ltd v Gilbert-Ash NI Ltd and others [1998] UKHL 19
 Boddington v British Transport Police [1998] UKHL 13
 Bolkiah v KPMG [1998] UKHL 52
 British Fuels Ltd v Baxendale and another and Wilson and others v St Helens Borough Council [1998] UKHL 37
 British Telecommunications plc v James Thomson and Sons (Engineers) Ltd (Scotland) [1998] UKHL 46
 R v Burt & Adams Ltd [1998] UKHL 14
 R v Chief Constable of Sussex, ex parte International Trader's Ferry Ltd [1998] UKHL 40
 City Council of Bristol v Lovell [1998] UKHL 8
 Clark and others v Kato, Smith and General Accident Fire & Life Assurance Corporation plc [1998] UKHL 36
 Commissioners of Customs and Excise v Thorn Materials Supply Ltd and Thorn Resources Ltd [1998] UKHL 23
 Cook v Financial Insurance Company Ltd [1998] UKHL 42
 Director of Public Prosecutions v Jackson; Stanley v Director of Public Prosecutions [1998] UKHL 31
 Dollar Land (Cumbernauld) Ltd v CIN Properties Ltd (Scotland) [1998] UKHL 26
 Effort Shipping Company Ltd v Linden Management SA and others [1998] UKHL 1
 Empress Car Company (Abertillery) Ltd v National Rivers Authority [1998] UKHL 5
 Ingram and another v Commissioners of Inland Revenue [1998] UKHL 47
 In re Ismail [1998] UKHL 32
 Jameson and another v Central Electricity Generating Board and others [1998] UKHL 51
 Kelly v Northern Ireland Housing Executive [1998] UKHL 33
 Kleinwort Benson Ltd v Lincoln City Council Kleinwort; Benson Ltd v Mayor etc of the London Borough of Southwark and others; Kleinwort Benson Ltd v Birmingham City Council Mayor etc of the London Borough of Kensington and Chelsea and others [1998] UKHL 38
 Krol v Craig (Scotland) [1998] UKHL 44
 In re L [1998] UKHL 24
 R v London Borough of Harrow [1998] UKHL 29
 Lowsley and another v Forbes (trading as LE Design Services) [1998] UKHL 34
 R v Minister of Agriculture, Fisheries and Food, ex parte Anastasiou (Pissouri) Ltd and others [1998] UKHL 21
 Nell Gwynn House Maintenance Fund v Commissioners of Customs and Excise [1998] UKHL 50
 Newlon Housing Trust v Alsulaimen and another [1998] UKHL 35
 Page v Sheerness Steel Company Ltd [1998] UKHL 27
 Pickford v Imperial Chemical Industries plc [1998] UKHL 25
 Preston and others v Wolverhampton Healthcare NHS and others [1998] UKHL 6
 Redrow Homes Ltd and others v Bett Brothers plc and others (Scotland) [1998] UKHL 2
 Reid v Secretary of State for Scotland and another [1998] UKHL 43
 R v Secretary of State for the Environment, ex parte Council of the London Borough of Camden [1998] UKHL 10
 R v Secretary of State for the Home Department and another, ex parte Francois [1998] UKHL 11
 R v Secretary of State for the Home Department, ex parte Adan [1998] UKHL 15
 R v Secretary of Statve for the Home Department [1998] UKHL 30
 R v Southwark Crown Court, ex parte Bowles [1998] UKHL 16
 Stewart v Secretary of State for Scotland (Scotland) [1998] UKHL 3
 Stocznia Gdanska SA v Latvian Shipping Co and others [1998] UKHL 9
 Strathclyde Regional Council and others v Wallace and others (Scotland) [1998] UKHL 4
 In re T (a minor) [1998] UKHL 20
 Taylor and others v Director of the Serious Fraud Office and others [1998] UKHL 39
 Total Gas Marketing Ltd v ARCO British Ltd and others [1998] UKHL 22
 White and others v Chief Constable of South Yorkshire and others [1998] UKHL 45
 Williams v Natural Life Health Foods Ltd [1998] UKHL 17
 R v Woollin [1998] UKHL 28

1999 

 Alan Wibberley Building Ltd v Insley [1999] UKHL 15
 Barclays Bank plc v Boulter and Boulter [1999] UKHL 39
 Barret v London Borough of Enfield [1999] UKHL 25
 Barry v Midland Bank plc [1999] UKHL 38
 R v Bartle and the Commissioner of Police for the Metropolis and others, ex parte Pinochet; R v Evans and another and the Commissioner of Police for the Metropolis and others, ex parte Pinochet [1999] UKHL 17
 R v Bingham [1999] UKHL 13
 R v Bow Street Magistrates' Court and Allison, ex parte Government of the United States of America [1999] UKHL 31
 Bruton v London and Quadrant Housing Trust [1999] UKHL 26
 Carmichael and another v National Power plc [1999] UKHL 47; [1999] 1 WLR 2042
 Christopher Moran Holdings Ltd v Bairstow and another [1999] UKHL 2
 Commissioners of Customs and Excise v British Telecommunications plc [1999] UKHL 3
 Commissioners of Customs and Excise v Redrow Group plc [1999] UKHL 4
 Commissioners of Police for the Metropolis v Reeves (Joint Administratix of the Estate of Martin Lynch, Deceased) [1999] UKHL 35
 Coventry and Solihull Waste Disposal Company Ltd v Russell [1999] UKHL 49
 Credit Lyonnais Nederland NV (now known as Generale Bank Nederland N.V.) v Export Credits Guarantee Department [1999] UKHL 9
 R v Criminal Injuries Compensation Board, ex parte A [1999] UKHL 21
 Dawson v Wearmouth [1999] UKHL 18
 Director of Public Prosecutions v Jones and another [1999] UKHL 5
 R v Director of Public Prosecutions, ex parte Kebeline and others [1999] UKHL 43
 In re Ellis and Gilligan [1999] UKHL 46
 Fitzpatrick v Sterling Housing Association Ltd [1999] UKHL 42
 Governor and Company of the Bank of Scotland v Brunswick Development [1999] UKHL 16
 Imperial Chemical Industries v Colmer [1999] UKHL 48
 Institute of Chartered Accountants in England and Wales v Commissioners of Customs and Excise [1999] UKHL 19
 R v Islam v Secretary of State for the Home Department Immigration Appeal Tribunal and another, ex parte Shah [1999] UKHL 20
 Kuwait Airways Corporation and another v Kuwait Insurance Company SAK and others [1999] UKHL 12
 London Borough of Southwark and another v Mills and others Baxter v Mayor etc of the London Borough of Camden [1999] UKHL 40
 Macfarlane and another v Tayside Health Board (Scotland) [1999] UKHL 50
 R v Manchester Stipendiary Magistrate and the Lord Advocate, ex parte Granada Television Ltd [1999] UKHL 51
 Mann and others v Secretary of State for Employment [1999] UKHL 29
 Mcknight v Sheppard [1999] UKHL 6
 Modahl v British Athletic Federation Limited [1999] UKHL 37
 Murray and another v Foyle Meats Ltd (Northern Ireland) [1999] UKHL 30
 Nessa v The Chief Adjudication Officer and another [1999] UKHL 41
 R v North Yorkshire County Council, ex parte Brown and another [1999] UKHL 7
 O'Neill and another v Phillips and others [1999] UKHL 24
 R v Oxfordshire County Council and others, ex parte Sunningwell Parish Council [1999] UKHL 28
 Piglowska v Piglowski [1999] UKHL 27
 In re Pinochet [1999] UKHL 1
 Platform Home Loans Ltd v Oyston Shipways Ltd and others [1999] UKHL 10
 Reynolds v Times Newspapers Ltd and others [1999] UKHL 45
 R v Royal Borough of Kensington and Chelsea, ex parte Lawrie Plantation Services Ltd [1999] UKHL 32
 R v Secretary of State for the Home Department, ex parte Salem [1999] UKHL 8
 R v Secretary of State for the Home Department, ex parte Simms Secretary of State for the Home Department, ex parte O'Brien [1999] UKHL 33
 R v Secretary of State for Transport, ex parte Factortame Ltd and others [1999] UKHL 44
 Society of Lloyd's v Robinson and another [1999] UKHL 22
 Svenska International plc v Commissioners of Customs and Excise [1999] UKHL 23
 Swiggs and others v Nagarajan [1999] UKHL 36
 Vehicle Inspectorate v Bruce Cook Road Planing Ltd and another [1999] UKHL 34
 Vehicle Inspectorate v Nuttall [1999] UKHL 14

2000 

 Agnew and others v Lansforsakringsbolagens A.B. [2000] UKHL 7
 Alfred McAlpine Construction Limited v Panatown Limited [2000] UKHL 43
 R v Antoine [2000] UKHL 20
 Arthur J.S. Hall and Co. v Simons and Barratt v Ansell and others v Scholfield Roberts and Hill [2000] UKHL 38
 Attorney General v Blake and another [2000] UKHL 45
 Attorney General's Reference No. 3 of 1999 [2000] UKHL 63
 B v Director of Public Prosecutions [2000] UKHL 13
 Barrett and others v Morgan [2000] UKHL 1
 Berezovsky v Michaels and others; Glouchkov v Michaels and others [2000] UKHL 25
 Berkeley v Secretary of State for the Environment and others [2000] UKHL 36
 Birmingham City Council v Oakley [2000] UKHL 59
 In re Burke [2000] UKHL 35
 Burridge v London Borough of Harrow and others [2000] UKHL 2
 Burton v Mayor etc of the London Borough of Camden [2000] UKHL 8
 Cadogan Estates Limited v Mcmahon [2000] UKHL 52
 Canada Trust Company v Stolzenberg and Gamba [2000] UKHL 51
 Chief Adjudication Officer v Faulds (Scotland) [2000] UKHL 26
 Darker and others v Chief Constable of the West Midlands Police [2000] UKHL 44
 Designer Guild Limited v Russell Williams (Textiles) Limited (trading as Washington DC) [2000] UKHL 58
 Dimond v Lovell [2000] UKHL 27
 Dingley v Chief Constable of Strathclyde Police [2000] UKHL 14
 Equitable Life Assurance Society v Hyman [2000] UKHL 39
 R v Forbes [2000] UKHL 66
 Foskett v McKeown and others [2000] UKHL 29
 Garner v Pounds Shipowners and Shipbreakers Ltd and one other action [2000] UKHL 30
 Glasgow City Council and others v Marshall and others (Scotland) [2000] UKHL 5
 Goodes v East Sussex County Council [2000] UKHL 34
 R v Governor of Her Majesty's Prison Brockhill, ex parte Evans [2000] UKHL 48
 Gregory v Portsmouth City Council [2000] UKHL 3
 In re H (a minor) [2000] UKHL 6
 Halfpenny v Ige Medical Systems Limited [2000] UKHL 64
 Hamilton v Al Fayed [2000] UKHL 18
 R v Hertfordshire County Council, ex parte Green Environmental Industries Ltd and another [2000] UKHL 11
 Hinks v R [2000] UKHL 53
 Holland v Lampen-Wolfe [2000] UKHL 40
 Horvath v Secretary of State for the Home Department [2000] UKHL 37
 Hurst v Bryk and others [2000] UKHL 19
 Inco Europe Ltd and others v First Choice Distribution (a firm) and others [2000] UKHL 15
 Johnson v Gore Wood & Co. [2000] UKHL 65
 Jolley v Sutton London Borough Council [2000] UKHL 31
 Lafarge Redlands Aggregates Limited v Shephard Hill Civil Engineering Limited [2000] UKHL 46
 Lancashire County Council and another v Barlow and another and one other action [2000] UKHL 16
 Lubbe and others v Cape plc and related appeals [2000] UKHL 41
 Miah and others v Khan [2000] UKHL 55
 R v Ministry of Defence, ex parte Walker [2000] UKHL 22
 Morgans v Director of Public Prosecutions [2000] UKHL 9
 Newell and others v Secretary of State for the Environment and another; Fletcher Estates (Harlescott) Ltd v Secretary of State for the Environment and another [2000] UKHL 10
 Phelps v Mayor etc. of the London Borough of Hillingdon Anderton and Clwyd County Council; In re G (a minor) v Hampshire County Council [2000] UKHL 47
 R v Secretary of State for Employment, ex parte Seymour Smith and another [2000] UKHL 12
 R v Secretary of State for Health and others, ex parte Imperial Tobacco Limited and others [2000] UKHL 60
 R v Secretary of State for the Environment, Transport and the Regions and another, ex parte Spath Holme Limited [2000] UKHL 61
 R v Secretary of State for the Home Department, ex parte A [2000] UKHL 4
 R v Secretary of State for the Home Department, ex parte Adan; R v Secretary of State for the Home Department ex parte Aitseguer [2000] UKHL 67
 R v Secretary of State for the Home Department, ex parte Hindley [2000] UKHL 21
 R v Secretary of State for Trade and Industry; ex parte Eastaway [2000] UKHL 56
 R v Smith [2000] UKHL 49
 Steed v Home Office [2000] UKHL 32
 Taylor v Secretary of State for Scotland (Scotland) [2000] UKHL 28
 Three Rivers District Council and others v Governor and Company of The Bank of England [2000] UKHL 33
 Turkington and others v Times Newspapers Limited (Northern Ireland) [2000] UKHL 57
 United Wire Limited v Screen Repair Services (Scotland) Limited and another and others [2000] UKHL 42
 W 1-6 v Essex County Council and another [2000] UKHL 17
 Walker v Centaur Clothes Group Ltd [2000] UKHL 23
 Waters v Commissioner of Police for the Metropolis [2000] UKHL 50
 Whistler International Limited v Kawasaki Kisen Kaisha Limited [2000] UKHL 62
 White v White [2000] UKHL 54
 Wisely v John Fulton Plumbers Ltd (Scotland) and Wadey v Surrey County Council [2000] UKHL 24

2001 

 R v A [2001] UKHL 25
 Abdulrahman Mohamed v The London Borough of Hammersmith & Fulham [2001] UKHL 57
 AIB Group (UK) plc v Martin and another [2001] UKHL 63
 R (Alconbury Developments Ltd) v Secretary of State for the Environment [2001] UKHL 23
 In re Al-Fawwaz [2001] UKHL 69
 R v Allen [2001] UKHL 45
 Amoco (UK) Exploration Company etc. and others v Teesside Gas Transportation Ltd and v Imperial Chemical Industries plc and others [2001] UKHL 18
 Aneco Reinsurance Underwriting Limited v Johnson & Higgins Limited [2001] UKHL 51
 Anyanwu and another v South Bank Student Union and another and Commission for Racial Equality [2001] UKHL 14
 Ashworth Frazer Limited v Gloucester City Council [2001] UKHL 59
 In re B (a minor) [2001] UKHL 70
 Bank of Credit and Commerce International SA v Munawar Ali, Sultana Runi Khan and others [2001] UKHL 8
 Bettison and others v Langton and others [2001] UKHL 24
 Borealis AB v Stargas Limited and others and Bergesen D.Y. A/S [2001] UKHL 17
 BP Exploration Operating Co Ltd v Chevron Transport (Scotland) [2001] UKHL 50
 Cantabrica Coach Holdings Limited v Vehicle Inspectorate [2001] UKHL 60
 Cantwell v Criminal Injuries Compensation Board (Scotland) [2001] UKHL 36
 Card Protection Plan Limited v Commissioners of Customs and Excise [2001] UKHL 4
 Chief Adjudication Officer v Stafford and Banks [2001] UKHL 33
 Chief Constable of West Yorkshire Police v Khan [2001] UKHL 48
 Commissioners of Customs and Excise v Liverpool Institute for Performing Arts [2001] UKHL 28
 Commissioners of Customs and Excise v Sinclair Collis Limited [2001] UKHL 30
 R v Commissioners of Inland Revenue, ex parte Newfields Developments Limited [2001] UKHL 27
 Consorzio Del Prosciutto Di Parma v Asda Stores Limited and others [2001] UKHL 7
 Delaware Mansions Limited and others v Lord Mayor and Citizens of the City of Westminster [2001] UKHL 55
 R v Dimsey [2001] UKHL 46
 Director General of Fair Trading v First National Bank plc [2001] UKHL 52
 Donohue v Armco Inc and others [2001] UKHL 64
 Eastbourne Town Radio Cars Association v Commissioners of Customs & Excise [2001] UKHL 19
 Farley v Skinner [2001] UKHL 49
 R v Forbesi [2001] UKHL 40
 Government of the United States of America v Montgomery and another [2001] UKHL 3
 Hallam v Cheltenham Borough Council and others [2001] UKHL 15
 R v Housing Benefit Review Board of the City of Westminster, ex parte Mehanne [2001] UKHL 11
 I and another and another v Director of Public Prosecutions; I and another and another v Director of Public Prosecutions [2001] UKHL 10
 R v Independent Television Commission, ex parte TV Danmark 1 Ltd [2001] UKHL 42
 International Power plc (formerly National Power plc) v Feldon and others; National Grid Co plc v Mayes and others [2001] UKHL 20
 Johnson v Unisys Limited [2001] UKHL 13
 R v K [2001] UKHL 41
 R v Kansal [2001] UKHL 62
 Kuddus (AP) v Chief Constable of Leicestershire Constabulary [2001] UKHL 29
 R v Lambert [2001] UKHL 37
 R v Leeds Crown Court, ex parte Wardle [2001] UKHL 12
 Lister and others v Hesley Hall Limited [2001] UKHL 22
 R v Loosely [2001] UKHL 53
 M (a minor) v Secretary of State for Social Security [2001] UKHL 35
 Macniven v Westmoreland Investments Limited [2001] UKHL 6
 Magill v Weeks [2001] UKHL 67
 Manifest Shipping Company Limited v Uni-Polaris Shipping Company Limited and others [2001] UKHL 1
 McGrath v Chief Constable of the Royal Ulster Constabulary and another (Northern Ireland) [2001] UKHL 39
 R v Minister of Agriculture, Fisheries and Food, ex parte S P Anastasiou (Pissouri) Limited and others [2001] UKHL 71
 Newspaper Licensing Agency Limited v Marks and Spencer plc [2001] UKHL 38
 In re Norris [2001] UKHL 34
 Optident Limited and another v Secretary of State for Trade and Industry and another [2001] UKHL 32
 R v Pendleton [2001] UKHL 66
 Phillips and another v Brewin Dolphin Bell Lawrie and another [2001] UKHL 2
 Preston and others v Wolverhampton Healthcare N.H.S. Trust and others; Fletcher and others v Midland Bank plc [2001] UKHL 5
 Pretty v Director of Public Prosecutions and Secretary of State for the Home Department [2001] UKHL 61
 Royal Bank of Scotland v Etridge (AP) [2001] UKHL 44
 R v Sargent [2001] UKHL 54
 Scandecor Developments AB v Scandecor Marketing AV and others and one other action [2001] UKHL 21
 Secretary of State for the Home Department v Rehman [2001] UKHL 47
 R (on the application of Daly) v Secretary of State for the Home Department [2001] UKHL 26
 Shanning International Ltd and others v Rasheed Bank and others [2001] UKHL 31
 R v Shayler
 Smith v Bridgend County Borough Council [2001] UKHL 58
 R v Smith [2001] UKHL 68
 Three Rivers District Council v Governor and Company of the Bank of England [2001] UKHL 16
 Turner v Grovit and others [2001] UKHL 65
 Uratemp Ventures Ltd v Collins (Ap) [2001] UKHL 43
 White v White and the Motor Insurers Bureau [2001] UKHL 9

2002 

 Albright & Wilson UK Ltd v Biachem Ltd and others [2002] UKHL 37
 R (on the application of Anderson) v Secretary of State for the Home Department [2002] UKHL 46
 Ashworth Security Hospital v MGN Ltd [2002] UKHL 29
 Attorney General v Punch Ltd [2002] UKHL 50
 R v Benjafield [2002] UKHL 2
 R v Boyd [2002] UKHL 31
 Caledonia North Sea Limited v British Telecommunications plc (Scotland) and others [2002] UKHL 4
 Callery v Gray [2002] UKHL 28
 Cape and Dalgleish v Fitzgerald and others [2002] UKHL 16
 Cave v Robinson Jarvis and Rolf [2002] UKHL 18
 Clingham v Royal Borough of Kensington and Chelsea [2002] UKHL 39
 R v Commissioner of Police for the Metropolis, ex parte Rottman [2002] UKHL 20
 Co-operative Retail Services Ltd and others v Taylor Young Partnership and others [2002] UKHL 17
 Commissioners of Customs and Excise v Plantiflor Ltd [2002] UKHL 33
 Dubai Aluminium Company Ltd v Salaam [2002] UKHL 48
 Earl of Balfour v Keeper of the Registers of Scotland and others [2002] UKHL 42
 R v East Sussex County Council, ex parte Reprotech (Pebsham) Ltd. and one other action [2002] UKHL 8
 Fairchild v Glenhaven Funeral Services Ltd and others [2002] UKHL 22
 Grobbelaar v News Group Newspapers Ltd [2002] UKHL 40
 Heaton and others v Axa Equity & Law Assurance Society plc and others [2002] UKHL 15
 J A Pye (Oxford) Ltd and others v Graham and another [2002] UKHL 30
 R v Jones [2002] UKHL 5
 Kahn and another v Commissioners of Inland Revenue [2002] UKHL 6
 King v Bristow Helicopters Ltd. (Scotland); In re M (a child) [2002] UKHL 7
 Kuwait Airways Corp v Iraqi Airways Co and another [2002] UKHL 19
 R v Lichniak [2002] UKHL 47
 R v London Borough of Hammersmith and Fulham and others [2002] UKHL 23
 R v Lyons and others [2002] UKHL 44
 Malekshad v Howard De Walden Estates Ltd [2002] UKHL 49
 R v Manchester City Council [2002] UKHL 34
 Medcalf v Weatherill and another [2002] UKHL 27
 National Westminster Bank plc v Amin and another [2002] UKHL 9
 In re Northern Ireland Human Rights Commission [2002] UKHL 25
 R (on the application of O'Byrne) v Secretary of State for the Environment, Transport and the Regions and others [2002] UKHL 45
 On Demand Information plc and others v Michael Gerson (Finance) and others [2002] UKHL 13
 R v Pope [2002] UKHL 26
 R v Rezvi [2002] UKHL 1
 Robertson v Fife Council [2002] UKHL 35
 Robinson v Secretary of State for Northern Ireland and others [2002] UKHL 32
 Royal Brompton Hospital National Health Service Trust v Hammond and others and Taylor Woodrow Construction (Holdings) Limited [2002] UKHL 14
 S v S and others [2002] UKHL 10
 R (on the application of Saadi and others) v Secretary of State for the Home Department [2002] UKHL 41
 R v Secretary of State for the Home Department, ex parte Zeqiri [2002] UKHL 3
 R v Shayler [2002] UKHL 11
 R v Special Commissioner and another, ex parte Morgan Grenfell & Co Ltd [2002] UKHL 21
 Standard Chartered Bank v Pakistan National Shipping Corp [2002] UKHL 43
 R (on the application of Thangarasa) v Secretary of State for the Home Department [2002] UKHL 36
 Westminster City Council v National Asylum Support Service [2002] UKHL 38
 Twinsectra Limited v Yardley and others [2002] UKHL 12
 R v Warrington Crown Court [2002] UKHL 24

2003 

 Actionstrength Ltd (trading as Vital Resources) v International Glass Engineering In.Gl.En. SpA and others [2003] UKHL 17
 R (on the application of Amin) v Secretary of State for the Home Department [2003] UKHL 51
 R (on the application of Anufrijeva) v Secretary of State for the Home Department and another [2003] UKHL 36
 Department for Environment, Food and Rur Affairs v ASDA Stores Ltd and another [2003] UKHL 71
 Attorney General's Reference No. 2 of 2001 [2003] UKHL 68
 Begum v London Borough of Tower Hamlets [2003] UKHL 5
 Bellinger v Bellinger [2003] UKHL 21
 R (on the application of Beresford) v City of Sunderland [2003] UKHL 60
 C R Smith Glaziers (Dunfermline) Ltd v Commissioners of Customs and Excise [2003] UKHL 7
 Consorzio del Prosciutto di Parma v ASDA Stores Limited and others [2003] UKHL 46
 Cullen v Chief Constable of the Royal Ulster Constabulary [2003] UKHL 39
 R v Dietschmann [2003] UKHL 10
 R v Drew [2003] UKHL 25
 Eram Shipping Company Ltd and others v Hong Kong and Shanghai Banking Corporation Ltd [2003] UKHL 30
 R (on the application of Giles) v Parole Board and another [2003] UKHL 42
 In re Guisto [2003] UKHL 19
 R v H [2003] UKHL 1
 HIH Casualty and General Insurance Ltd and others v Chase Manhattan Bank and others [2003] UKHL 6
 Taylor (HM Inspector of Taxes) v MEPC Holdings Ltd [2003] UKHL 70
 R (on the application of IH) v Secretary of State for the Home Department and another [2003] UKHL 59
 Inland Revenue v Laird Group plc [2003] UKHL 54
 John Lyon's Charity v Shalson [2003] UKHL 32
 R v Johnstone [2003] UKHL 28
 In re Kanaris [2003] UKHL 2
 Kuwait Oil Tanker Company SAK and others v UBS AG [2003] UKHL 31
 In re L (a minor [2003] UKHL 9
 Lagden v O'Connor [2003] UKHL 64
 Lawal v Northern Spirit Ltd [2003] UKHL 35
 Lex Service plc v Customs and Excise [2003] UKHL 67
 Lloyds TSB General Insurance Holdings and others v Lloyds Bank Group Insurance Company Ltd [2003] UKHL 48
 London Borough of Harrow v Qazi [2003] UKHL 43
 MacDonald v Advocate General for Scotland [2003] UKHL 34
 Marcic v Thames Water Utilities Ltd [2003] UKHL 66
 Matthews v Ministry of Defence [2003] UKHL 4
 McDonnell v Congregation of Christian Brothers Trustees and others [2003] UKHL 63
 Mirvahedy v Henley and another [2003] UKHL 16
 Moyna v Secretary of State for Work and Pensions [2003] UKHL 44
 Mulkerrins v Pricewaterhouse Coopers [2003] UKHL 41
 In re O and N (minors) [2003] UKHL 18
 Official Receiver v Wadge Rapps & Hunt (a firm) and another [2003] UKHL 49
 R (on the application of Oy) v Bristol Magistrates Court and others [2003] UKHL 55
 In re P (a minor) [2003] UKHL 8
 Parochial Church Council of the Parish of Aston Cantlow and Wilmcote with Billesley, Warwickshire v Wallbank and another [2003] UKHL 37
 R (on the application of ProLife Alliance) v British Broadcasting Corporation [2003] UKHL 23
 R (on the application of Quintavalle) v Secretary of State for Health [2003] UKHL 13
 R v Central Valuation Officer and others [2003] UKHL 20
 Rees v Darlington Memorial Hospital NHS Trust [2003] UKHL 52
 R v G and another [2003] UKHL 50
 R v Randall [2003] UKHL 69
 Relaxion Group plc v Rhys-Harper [2003] UKHL 33
 Royal and Sun Alliance Insurance Group plc v Commissioners of Customs and Excise [2003] UKHL 29
 R (on the application of Rusbridger and another) v Her Majesty's Attorney General [2003] UKHL 38
 Russell v Devine [2003] UKHL 24
 Sage v Secretary of State for the Environment, Transport and the Regions and others [2003] UKHL 22
 R (on the application of Sepet and another) v Secretary of State for the Home Department [2003] UKHL 15
 Shamoon v Chief Constable of the Royal Ulster Constabulary [2003] UKHL 11
 In re Shields (Northern Ireland) [2003] UKHL 3
 Shogun Finance Ltd v Hudson [2003] UKHL 62
 R (on the application of Sivakumar) v Secretary of State for the Home Department [2003] UKHL 14
 Skidmore v Dartford & Gravesham NHS Trust [2003] UKHL 27
 "Starsin", owners of cargo and others v "Starsin", Owners and/or demise charterers and two other actions [2003] UKHL 12
 Thomson v Kvaerner Govan Ltd (Scotland) [2003] UKHL 45
 Tomlinson v Congleton Borough Council and others [2003] UKHL 47
 Transco plc v Stockport Metropolitan Borough Council [2003] UKHL 61
 Venables and others v Hornby (HM Inspector of Taxes) [2003] UKHL 65
 R (on the application of von Brandenburg) v East London and the City Mental Health NHS Trust and another [2003] UKHL 58
 R (on the application of W) v London Borough of Barnet [2003] UKHL 57
 Wainwright and another v Home Office [2003] UKHL 53
 Wilson and others v Secretary of State for Trade and Industry [2003] UKHL 40
 Wrexham County Borough Council v Berry [2003] UKHL 26

2004 

 A and others v Secretary of State for the Home Department [2004] UKHL 56
 A v West Yorkshire Police [2004] UKHL 21
 Adams v Bracknell Forest Borough Council [2004] UKHL 29
 Al-Ameri v Royal Borough of Kensington and Chelsea [2004] UKHL 4
 Archibald v Fife Council [2004] UKHL 32
 Attorney General's Reference No 5 of 2002 [2004] UKHL 40
 Bakewell Management Ltd v Brandwood and others [2004] UKHL 14
 Barber v Somerset County Council [2004] UKHL 13
 Barclays Mercantile Business Finance Ltd v HM Inspector of Taxes [2004] UKHL 51
 Beynon and Partners v Commissioners of Customs and Excise [2004] UKHL 53
 Buchanan v Alba Diagnostics Ltd [2004] UKHL 5
 Buchler and another v Talbot and another [2004] UKHL 9
 Burnett's Trustee v Grainger and another [2004] UKHL 8
 Campbell v Mirror Group Newspapers Ltd [2004] UKHL 22
 Chester v Afshar [2004] UKHL 41
 Cream Holdings Ltd and others v Banerjee and others [2004] UKHL 44
 Criterion Properties plc v Stratford UK Properties LLC and others [2004] UKHL 28
 Customs and Excise v Zielinski Baker & Partners Ltd [2004] UKHL 7
 Davidson v Scottish Ministers [2004] UKHL 34
 Dunnachie v Kingston-upon-Hull City Coincil [2004] UKHL 36
 Eastwood and another v Magnox Electric plc [2004] UKHL 35
 R (on the application of European Roma Rights Centre and others) v Immigration Officer at Prague Airport and another [2004] UKHL 55
 Fytche v Wincanton Logistics plc [2004] UKHL 31
 Ghaidan v Godin-Mendoza [2004] UKHL 30
 Gorringe v Calderdale Metropolitan Borough Council [2004] UKHL 15
 R (on the application of Green) v Police Complaints Authority [2004] UKHL 6
 R v H [2004] UKHL 3
 Inland Revenue v Scottish Provident Institution [2004] UKHL 52
 Jerome v Kelly (HM Inspector of Taxes) [2004] UKHL 25
 Jindal Iron and Steel Co Ltd and others v Islamic Solidarity Shipping Company Jordan Inc [2004] UKHL 49
 Kerr v Department for Social Development (Northern Ireland) [2004] UKHL 23
 Kirin-Amgen Inc and others v Hoechst Marion Roussel Ltd and others [2004] UKHL 46
 R (on application of LS) v South Yorkshire Police (Consolidated Appeals) [2004] UKHL 39
 In re McFarland (Northern Ireland) [2004] UKHL 17
 In re McKerr (Northern Ireland) [2004] UKHL 12
 R (on the application of Middleton) v Coroner for the Western District of Somerset [2004] UKHL 10
 R v Montila and others [2004] UKHL 50
 R (on the application of Mullen) v Secretary of State for the Home Department [2004] UKHL 18
 R v J [2004] UKHL 42
 R (on the Application of Razgar) v Secretary of State for the Home Department [2004] UKHL 27
 R v Connor and another [2004] UKHL 2
 R v Webber [2004] UKHL 1
 In re S (a child) [2004] UKHL 47
 Sabaf SpA v MFI Furniture Centres Ltd and others [2004] UKHL 45
 R (on the application of Sacker) v Coroner for the County of West Yorkshire [2004] UKHL 11
 Secretary of State for Trade and Industry v Frid [2004] UKHL 24
 Sheldrake v Director of Public Prosecutions [2004] UKHL 43
 Simmons v British Steel plc (Scotland) [2004] UKHL 20
 Sirius International Insurance Co v FAI General Insurance Ltd and others [2004] UKHL 54
 South Bucks District Council and another v Porter [2004] UKHL 33
 Stewart v Perth and Kinross Council [2004] UKHL 16
 Three Rivers District Council and others v Bank of England [2004] UKHL 48
 R (on the application of Ullah) v Special Adjudicator [2004] UKHL 26
 United States of America v Barnette and another [2004] UKHL 37
 R (on the application of Uttley) v Secretary of State for the Home Department [2004] UKHL 38
 Waters and others v Welsh Development Agency [2004] UKHL 19

2005 
 A and others v Secretary of State for the Home Department [2005] UKHL 71
 R (on the application of Adam) v Secretary of State for the Home Department [2005] UKHL 66
 Akumah v London Borough of Hackney [2005] UKHL 17
 R (on the application of Al-Hasan) v Secretary of State for the Home Department [2005] UKHL 13
 HM Attorney General v Scotcher [2005] UKHL 36
 Autologic Holdings plc and others v Commissioners of Inland Revenue [2005] UKHL 54
 R (on the application of B) v Ashworth Hospital Authority [2005] UKHL 20
 R (on the application of Bagdanavicius and another) v Secretary of State for the Home Department [2005] UKHL 38
 R v Bentham [2005] UKHL 18
 Brooks v Commissioner of Police for the Metropolis and others [2005] UKHL 24
 Campbell v MGN Ltd [2005] UKHL 61
 R (on the application of Carson and Reynolds) v Secretary of State for Work and Pensions [2005] UKHL 37
 College of Estate Management v HM Commissioners of Customs and Excise [2005] UKHL 62
 Concord Trust v Law Debenture Trust Corporation plc [2005] UKHL 27
 In re D (a child) [2005] UKHL 33
 R (on the application of D (a minor)) v Camberwell Green Youth Court [2005] UKHL 4
 Davidson v Scottish Ministers (Scotland) [2005] UKHL 74
 Deep Vein Thrombosis and Air Travel Group Litigation (8 actions) [2005] UKHL 72
 R (on the application of Dudson) v Secretary of State for the Home Department [2005] UKHL 52
 Fraser and another v Canterbury Diocesan Board of Finance and others [2005] UKHL 65
 Greenalls Management Ltd v HM Commissiomers of Customs and Excise [2005] UKHL 34
 R (on the application of Greenfield) v Secretary of State for the Home Department [2005] UKHL 14
 Gregg v Scott [2005] UKHL 2
 R (on the application of Hammond) (FC) v Secretary of State for the Home Department [2005] UKHL 69
 R v Hasan [2005] UKHL 22
 Hilton v Barker Booth and Eastwood (a firm) [2005] UKHL 8
 Hinchy v Secretary of State for Work and Pensions [2005] UKHL 16
 McDonald (HM Inspector of Taxes) v Dextra Accessories Ltd [2005] UKHL 47
 R (on the application of Hooper and others) v Secretary of State for Work and Pensions [2005] UKHL 29
 Hoxha and another v Secretary of State for the Home Department [2005] UKHL 19
 In re J (a child) [2005] UKHL 40
 Jackson and another v Royal Bank of Scotland [2005] UKHL 3
 Jackson and others v HM Attorney General [2005] UKHL 56
 JD v East Berkshire Community Health NHS Trust and others [2005] UKHL 23
 JI MacWilliam Company Inc v Mediterranean Shipping Company SA [2005] UKHL 11
 R (on the application of Kehoe) v Secretary of State for Work and Pensions [2005] UKHL 48
 Kent County Council v G and others [2005] UKHL 68
 R (on the application of Khadir) v Secretary of State for the Home Department [2005] UKHL 39
 Office of the King's Prosecutor, Brussels v Armas and another [2005] UKHL 67
 R v Knights and another [2005] UKHL 50
 Lesotho Highlands Development Authority v Impregilo SpA and others [2005] UKHL 43
 London Diocesan Fund and others v Avonridge Property Company Ltd [2005] UKHL 70
 Mark v Mark [2005] UKHL 42
 Marks and Spencer plc v HM Commissioners of Customs and Excise [2005] UKHL 53
 In re McClean [2005] UKHL 46
 MH v Secretary of State for the Department of Health and others [2005] UKHL 60
 Moy v Pettmann Smith (a firm) [2005] UKHL 7
 R (on the application of Munjaz) v Ashworth Hospital Authority [2005] UKHL 58
 N v Secretary of State for the Home Department [2005] UKHL 31
 National Westminster Bank plc v Spectrum Plus Limited and others [2005] UKHL 41
 O'Brien v Chief Constable of South Wales Police [2005] UKHL 26
 Percy v Church of Scotland Board of National Mission (Scotland) [2005] UKHL 73
 Polanski v Conde Nast Publications Ltd [2005] UKHL 10
 R (on the application of Quark Fishing Ltd) v Secretary of State for Foreign and Commonwealth Affairs [2005] UKHL 57
 Quintavalle v Human Fertilisation and Embryology Authority [2005] UKHL 28
 R v Hayter [2005] UKHL 6
 R v Becouarn [2005] UKHL 55
 R v Rimmington [2005] UKHL 63
 R v Z [2005] UKHL 35
 R (on the application of R) v Durham Constabulary and another [2005] UKHL 21
 Regina v Mushtaq [2005] UKHL 25
 Regina v Smith [2005] UKHL 12
 R v Rimmington [2005] UKHL 63
 Roberts v Parole Board [2005] UKHL 45
 R (on the application of Smith) v Parole Board [2005] UKHL 1
 R (on the application of Smith) v Secretary of State for the Home Department [2005] UKHL 51
 R v Soneji and another [2005] UKHL 49
 Synthon BV v SmithKline Beecham plc [2005] UKHL 59
 Szoma v Secretary of State for the Department of Work and Pensions [2005] UKHL 64
 Trennery v West [2005] UKHL 5
 R v Wang [2005] UKHL 9
 Ward v Commissioner of Police for the Metropolis and others [2005] UKHL 32
 West Bromwich Building Society v Wilkinson and another [2005] UKHL 44
 R (on the application of Wilkinson) v Inland Revenue [2005] UKHL 30
 R (on the application of Williamson) v Secretary of State for Education and Employment and others [2005] UKHL 15

2006 

 Agassi v Her Majesty's Inspector of Taxes [2006] UKHL 23
 Ali v Lord Grey School [2006] UKHL 14
 Barker v Corus (UK) plc [2006] UKHL 20
 R (on the application of Begum) v Denbigh High School [2006] UKHL 15
 Bradford & Bingley plc v Rashid [2006] UKHL 37
 Burton (HM Collector of Taxes) v Mellham Ltd [2006] UKHL 6
 R (on the application of Bushell and others) v Newcastle upon Tyne Licensing Justices and another [2006] UKHL 7
 R (on the application of the Corporation of London) v Secretary of State for Environment, Food and Rural Affairs and others[2006] UKHL 30
 HM Commissioners of Customs and Excise v Barclays Bank plc [2006] UKHL 28
 Director of Public Prosecutions v Collins [2006] UKHL 40
 Down Lisburn Health and Social Services Trust and another v H and another (Northern Ireland) [2006] UKHL 36
 Farley v Child Support Agency and another [2006] UKHL 31
 In re G (children) [2006] UKHL 43
 R (on the application of Gillan) v Commissioner of Police for the Metropolis and another [2006] UKHL 12
 Gillies v Secretary of State for Work and Pensions [2006] UKHL 2
 Harding v Wealands [2006] UKHL 32
 Haward and others v Fawcetts (a firm) and others [2006] UKHL 9
 Henderson v 3052775 Nova Scotia Ltd [2006] UKHL 21
 Horton v Sadler and another [2006] UKHL 27
 Jameel v Wall Street Journal Europe [2006] UKHL 44
 Januzi v Secretary of State for the Home Department and others [2006] UKHL 5
 Jones v Ministry of Interior for the Kingdom of Saudi Arabia and others [2006] UKHL 26
 Kay and another v London Borough of Lambeth and others [2006] UKHL 10
 Law Society v Sephton & Co (a firm) and others [2006] UKHL 22
 Matthews and others v Kent and Medway Towns and Fire Authority and others [2006] UKHL 8
 Miller v Miller [2006] UKHL 24
 North Wales Training and Enterprise Council Ltd v Astley and others [2006] UKHL 29
 Oxfordshire County Council v Oxford City Council and others (2005) and others [2006] UKHL 25
 Pirelli Cable Holding NV and others v Inland Revenue [2006] UKHL 4
 Powerhouse Retail Ltd and others v Burroughs and others [2006] UKHL 13
 R v Jones [2006] UKHL 16
 R v Longworth[2006] UKHL 1
 R v Saik [2006] UKHL 18
 Secretary of State for Trade and Industry v Rutherford and others [2006] UKHL 19
 Secretary of State for Work and Pensions v M [2006] UKHL 11
 Serco Ltd v Lawson [2006] UKHL 3
 Watkins v Home Office and others [2006] UKHL 17
 Margine v Ministry of Defence [2008] 1 All E.R. 154: Illegality of customised weapons in the Territorial Army

2007

2008

2009

See also
 List of notable United Kingdom House of Lords cases

 
House of Lords
House of Lords cases
Cases